The term "Islamic university" (Jami'ah Islamiyah), sometimes called madrasah jāmiʿah, can be used to describe secular educational institutions that were founded by people of Islamic tradition as well as institutions that focus on teaching Islam as a main curriculum. The word "madrasah" can refer to an Islamic educational institution of any level, while the word jāmiʿah simply means "university."

However, there are various institutions which include "Islamic University" in their name while being not necessarily geared towards the teaching of Islam (much like how a Catholic university generally does not teach Catholicism).

See also
 Islamic seminaries

Islamic universities and colleges
Islamic terminology